Yangelskoye (Yängel) is a rural locality (a selo) and the administrative center of Yangilsky Selsoviet, Abzelilovsky District, Bashkortostan, Russia. The population was 1,332 as of 2010. There are 30 streets.

Geography 
Yangelskoye is located 27 km southeast of Askarovo (the district's administrative centre) by road. Borisovo is the nearest rural locality.

References 

Rural localities in Abzelilovsky District